Paloma School District 94 is a public school district based in Maricopa County, Arizona.

External links
 

School districts in Maricopa County, Arizona